Empress Ki is a South Korean historical drama television series starring Ha Ji-won as the titular Empress Ki. It aired on MBC from October 28, 2013, to April 29, 2014, on Mondays and Tuesdays at 21:55 for 51 episodes.

A domestic and overseas hit, the series received the Golden Bird Prize for Serial Drama at the 9th Seoul International Drama Awards. Ha Ji-won also won the Grand Prize at the MBC Drama Awards for her performance.

Title
The early working title was Hwatu (lit. "Battle of Flowers") but the title was changed to prevent confusion with the similarly named playing cards.

Synopsis
The series revolves around Ki Seung-nyang, a Goryeo-born woman who ascends to power despite the restrictions of the era's class system, and later marries Toghon Temür (emperor of the Yuan dynasty) to become a Yuan empress, instead of her first love, Wang Yoo. It managed to highlight the deep love the Emperor embedded in Lady Ki and depicts her loves and political ambitions.

Cast

Main
Ha Ji-won as Ki Seung-nyang / Ki Nyang, the future Empress Ki
Jung Ji-so as young Ki Seung-nyang
A woman who was born in Goryeo and becomes the Empress Consort of Yuan dynasty. She is initially the fiancée of Wang Yoo, but later becomes the wife of Ta Hwan thus making her Yuan's Empress Consort.
 Joo Jin-mo as Wang Yoo, King Choonghye
Ahn Do-gyu as young Wang Yoo
The King of Goryeo who is Ki Seung-nyang's first love and fiance. He later died in Yuan dynasty.
Ji Chang-wook as Toghon Temür / Ta Hwan
The last Emperor of Yuan dynasty and Seung-nyang's true love and later husband.
Baek Jin-hee as Tanashiri, daughter of Yeon-chul
A noblewoman who was the first wife and Empress Consort of Ta Hwan but when her crimes are revealed, is deposed from her throne and is executed in front of her people. Tanashiri serves as the main antagonist of the first chapter who plotted to kill Seung-nyang’s friends and poison anyone who dare to take her throne.

Supporting

People in Yuan Dynasty

Imperial household
Kim Seo-hyung as the Empress Dowager; Ta Hwan's aunt. However, due to her greed, she attempted to kill Ta Hwan but failed and committed suicide as she is unwilling to accept defeat. 
Lim Ju-eun as Bayan Khutugh, niece of Baek Ahn
The evil second wife and Empress Consort of Ta Hwan after Tanashiri's death. She was also deposed from her position due to her cunningness.
Jeon Se-hyun as Lady Oh; Ta Hwan's Mongolian concubine. She is the daughter of Governor Ohgwang of Yunnan.
Park Ha-na as Lady Bu; Ta Hwan's Mongolian concubine. She is daughter of Governor Busaqui of Lingbei.

Nobleman and ministers
Jeon Gook-hwan as Yeon Chul; Empress Tanashiri's merciless father and Yuan Dynasty's regent.
Kim Jung-hyun as Dang Ki-se; Yeon Chul's ruthless eldest son and Empress Tanashiri's oldest brother.
Cha Do-jin as Tap Ja-hae; Yeon Chul's greedy second son and Empress Tanashiri's second older brother.
Kim Young-ho as Baek Ahn
Empress Bayan Khutugh's uncle who succeeded Yeon Chul's position as Yuan Dynasty's regent. He was later killed by Tal Tal for being greedy and evil like Yeon Chul.
Jin Yi-han as Tal Tal
Empress Bayan Khutugh's cousin and Baek Ahn's nephew. Following his uncle died, Tal Tal become the new Yuan Dynasty's regent.
Cha Kwang-soo as Go Yong-bo
Lee Gye-young as Busaqui
Jang Soon-gook as Seol Do-kan
Park Tong-il as Haeng Sung-joo

Servants and maids
Lee Won-jong as Dok-man; Goryeo-born who become the Yuan eunuch in Aekjung Palace.
Shin Seung-hwan as Kkwe-bo
Choi Moo-sung as Park Bul-hwa; Goryeo-born who become the Yuan eunuch.
Jung-Yoon as Kook-soo
Lee Eung-kyung as Court Lady Noh
Seo Yi-sook as Court Lady Seo; Empress Tanashiri's right-hand servant. The one who reveals Prince Maha's birth mother.
Yoon A-jung as Yeon-hwa / Court Lady Yeon - The evil servant who tortures Seung-nyang. After conniving with Tanashiri and Lady Seo to steal the baby from the maid by poisoning them, she was granted a Court Lady position.
Lee Ji-hyun as Hong-dan
Kim Myung-gook as Jang Soon-yong

People in Goryeo Dynasty

Royal household
Kwon Tae-won as Wang Man, King Choongsook
Ryu Hyun-kyung as Princess Kyunghwa; Yuan-born who become King Choongsok's wife.
Lee Jae-yong as Wang Go, Prince Yeonan, King Simyang; a Royal Family member and the head of Chirwon Faction.
Choi Jung-won as Wang Gi, Grand Prince Gangneung, later King Gongmin

People around Wang Yoo
Lee Moon-sik as Bang Shin-woo; Goryeo's eunuch.
Kwon Oh-joong as Choi Moo-song; a man who died in Yuan Dynasty together with Wang Yoo.
Yoon Yong-hyun as Jeom Park-yi; Goryeo Kings' assistant and servant.
Yoo In-young as Yeon Bi-soo / Batoru; a woman who has crush on Wang Yoo but later died after protect him.
Seo In-woo as Soo-ri; Batoru's aide.
Song Kyung-chul as Mak-saeng / Jeok-ho; a village chief in Goryeo Dynasty who become the Yuan Emperor's eunuch.

Other
Kim Myung-soo as Ki Ja-oh, King Yeongahn, Ki Seung-nyang's father and a royal commander.
Kim Jin-seong as Prince Maha; Wang Yoo and Seung-nyang's son who is adopted by Tanashiri.
Seol Wo-hyung as young Prince Maha
Jung Woong-in as Yeom Byung-soo
Kim Hyung-bum as Jo-cham
Jo Jae-yoon as Golta; the main antagonist in the series and a Yuan's eunuch.
Kim Jin-woo as Ayushiridara (Biligtü Khan); Ta Hwan and Seung-nyang's son.
Lee Shi-woo as young Ayushiridara
 Jo Woo-jin as Wang Go's soldier

Special appearances 
Kim Ye-ryung as Lady Lee; Seung-nyang's mother.
Lee Jung-sung as Kim Soon-jo
Oh Kwang-rok as Heuk-soo
Kim Moo-young as Na-moo
Han Hye-rin as Park Ohjin; Ta Hwan's Korean concubine. She was a court lady in the Yuan Palace before she became a concubine. Her life as a concubine became tragic.
Shim Yi-young as a fortune teller (Episode 28)
Park Hae-mi as a shaman (Episodes 34–35)
Seo Bum-shik as Won-jin
Jung Byung-ho as Joo Gook-chung
Jung Soo-in as a Courtesan
Seo Ji-yeon as an Inspector Court Lady
Son Kwang-up as the killer Mak-son
Yoon Young-mok as a coward captain
Jung Jae-min as Yirinjilban
Choi-Hyun as Ballachupmokah
Kim Hyo-won as Emperor Myungjong of Yuan; the former emperor of Yuan.

Original soundtrack

OST Part 1

OST Part 2

OST Part 3

OST Part 4

OST Part 5

OST Part 6

OST Part 7

Reception
The series attained high ratings during its run, ranking first in its timeslot with a peak viewership rating of 33.9 percent. According to a report by Taiwan's drama channel ETTV, the series was ranked as the best foreign program for 2014 with 5.35% viewership rating, becoming the second Korean drama after Jewel in the Palace (2003) to do so. It also received positive reviews for its strong acting skills, gripping background and elaborate scenes.

Despite its popularity, the series was criticized for its inclusion of fictional elements regarding the characters and storyline. Much concern was raised over the series' depiction of the titular Empress Ki, who was portrayed as a brave warrior in the series. Historians were worried that the audience would overlook the fact that the real-life Empress Ki was responsible for attacking her native land.

Ratings
In this table,  represent the lowest ratings and  represent the highest ratings.

It aired on GMA Network from October 20, 2014, to April 14, 2015, on Mondays to Thursdays at 10:00 PM PST for 100 episodes. Each episode runs 1 hour including commercial breaks. It was pre-empted on December 31, 2014, to give way to the Countdown to 2015 GMA New Year Special and on April 2 to 3, 2015 to give way on the Holy Week programming. The entire series was dubbed in Filipino. It was the highest rated Korean drama in the Philippines for 2015.
It was re-aired on GMA News TV from July 12, 2016, to January 19, 2017.

Awards and nominations

References

External links
 Empress Ki official MBC website
 Empress Ki at MBC Global Media
 Empress Ki at Victory Contents 
 
 

South Korean historical television series
Historical romance television series
2013 South Korean television series debuts
2014 South Korean television series endings
MBC TV television dramas
Television series set in Goryeo
Television shows written by Jang Young-chul
Television series set in the 14th century
Television series set in the Yuan dynasty
Television series by Victory Contents